Lepidospora is a genus of silverfish in the family Nicoletiidae.

Species
 Lepidospora afra Silvestri, 1908
 Lepidospora alticola Wygodzinsky, 1965
 Lepidospora angustotergum Mendes, 2002
 Lepidospora attenuata Mendes, 2004
 Lepidospora braueri Escherich, 1905
 Lepidospora buxtoni Silvestri, 1923
 Lepidospora ceylonica Silvestri, 1911
 Lepidospora deharvengi Mendes, 2002
 Lepidospora digitata Mendes, 2002
 Lepidospora escherichi Silvestri, 1908
 Lepidospora gracilis Escherich, 1905
 Lepidospora grassii (Escherich, 1905)
 Lepidospora guesteni Mendes, 2004
 Lepidospora hemitrica Silvestri, 1942
 Lepidospora hemitrichoides Wygodzinsky, 1962
 Lepidospora insularum Wygodinsky, 1955
 Lepidospora kinolaensis Mendes, 2002
 Lepidospora kurda Mendes, 1985
 Lepidospora machadoi Silvestri, 1949
 Lepidospora makapaan Wygodzinsky, 1955
 Lepidospora mascareniensis Mendes, 1996
 Lepidospora meridionalis Silvestri, 1913
 Lepidospora multispina Mendes, 2002
 Lepidospora notabilis Silvestri, 1913
 Lepidospora ruwenzoriensis Mendes, 2002
 Lepidospora silvestrii Wygodzinsky, 1942
 Lepidospora vilhenae Silvestri, 1949
 Lepidospora worunzire Mendes, 2002
 Lepidospora wygodzinskyi Mendes, 1992

References

insect genera